Newman is a small El Paso neighborhood in far Northeast El Paso, located some 16 miles northeast of downtown El Paso around the intersection of Dyer Street and Edge of Texas Drive on the New Mexico state line, and still sometimes described as a separate community. In 1990 it had a population of about 60 people.

It was named for real estate developer Henry L. Newman, who earlier tried to develop Newman, New Mexico, just to the north across the New Mexico border, without much success.  He fared only moderately better in Texas. In 1930 the United States Census listed Newman as having a population of 10 people.

Newman had a post office from 1922 to 1971. Located in the neighborhood is a bar, the Last Roundup, once favored by the late University of Texas at El Paso men's basketball coach Don Haskins, and a restaurant, the Edge of Texas Steakhouse, set up  by a local cattle rancher, Jimmy Bowen, as part of his effort to diversify his businesses as development in the city of El Paso, which annexed the area including Newman in the 1980s, moved closer to his land.

Populated places in El Paso County, Texas
Unincorporated communities in Texas